is a Prefectural Natural Park in the mountains and foothills of northeast Ōsaka Prefecture, Japan. Established in 2001, the park comprises ten non-contiguous areas scattered over the municipalities of Ibaraki, Minō, Nose, Shimamoto, Takatsuki and Toyono.

See also
 National Parks of Japan
 Kongō-Ikoma-Kisen Quasi-National Park
 Meiji no Mori Minō Quasi-National Park
 Hannan-Misaki Prefectural Natural Park
 Satoyama

References

Parks and gardens in Osaka Prefecture
Protected areas established in 2001